Pidan may refer to:
Pi dan or Century egg, a type of preserved egg used in Chinese cuisine
Pidan (textile), a type of silk cloth used as a tapestry in Cambodia
Pidan island, a river island in the Yalu river, North Korea
Pidan Mountain, Primorsky Krai, Russia
Mount Livadiyskaya, also known as "Pidan" or "Pedan", a mountain in Primorsky Krai, Russia